Mile Svilar (born 27 August 1999) is a Serbian professional footballer who plays as a goalkeeper for Serie A club Roma and the Serbia national team.

Club career

Early career and Anderlecht
Svilar is a product of the Belgian youth teams of KFCO Wilrijk and Beerschot A.C., while in 2010 he joined the Belgian giant Anderlecht in which during the 2016–17 season, he became part of the first team as the third choice goalkeeper, but he did not appear in any game.

Benfica
Svilar signed a five-year contract with Portuguese champions Benfica on 28 August 2017. On 14 October, he made his debut with the club in a 1–0 victory over Olhanense, becoming the youngest goalkeeper to ever play for Benfica. In international competition, he broke Iker Casillas's record as the youngest goalkeeper to ever play in the Champions League on 18 October 2017, in a 1–0 home defeat to Manchester United, aged 18 years and 52 days. In the return leg against the English side, aged 18 years and 65 days, he became the youngest goalkeeper ever to save a penalty in a Champions League match. In the same match, which ended in a 2–0 away defeat, he also became the youngest player ever to score an own goal in the competition.

Roma
On 1 July 2022, Svilar signed a contract with Serie A club Roma until 30 June 2027.

International career

Youth
Svilar was a member of Belgium U-16, Belgium U-17, Belgium U-18 national teams and was also a member of Belgium U-19. He was the first choice goalkeeper for the Belgium U-17 team at the 2016 UEFA European Under-17 Championship in Azerbaijan.

Senior
Born in Belgium to Serbian parents, Svilar is eligible to represent Belgium or Serbia. On 4 November 2017, he announced that he would play his first game for the Serbia national team in March 2018, as he accepted the call from the Football Association of Serbia. He debuted with Serbia in a friendly 4–0 win over Qatar on 1 September 2021.

Personal life
Svilar has a Serbian passport. His father, Ratko, is a former Serbian goalkeeper.

Career statistics

Club

International

Honours
Anderlecht
 Belgian Super Cup: 2017

Benfica
 Primeira Liga: 2018–19

See also
 European Cup and UEFA Champions League records and statistics
 List of association football families

References

External links

 Profile at the A.S. Roma website
 
 

1999 births
Living people
Footballers from Antwerp
Association football goalkeepers
Serbian footballers
Serbia international footballers
Belgian footballers
Belgium youth international footballers
Belgium under-21 international footballers
Belgian people of Serbian descent
Primeira Liga players
Liga Portugal 2 players
S.L. Benfica footballers
S.L. Benfica B players
A.S. Roma players
Serbian expatriate sportspeople in Portugal
Belgian expatriate footballers
Belgian expatriate sportspeople in Portugal
Expatriate footballers in Portugal
Serbian expatriate sportspeople in Italy
Expatriate footballers in Italy
Belgian expatriate sportspeople in Italy